Höhr-Grenzhausen is a town in the Westerwaldkreis in Rhineland-Palatinate, Germany. It is a centre for the ceramic industry in the Kannenbäckerland with a professional college for ceramics, another for ceramic form, and many others, hence the nickname Kannenbäckerstadt (roughly, “Jug Baking Town”).

Together with the communities of Hillscheid, Hilgert and Kammerforst it has formed the Verbandsgemeinde of Höhr-Grenzhausen – a kind of collective municipality – since 1971.

Geography
Höhr-Grenzhausen lies roughly 10 km west of Montabaur, and 10 km northeast of Koblenz.

Politics

Town council

(as of municipal election on 13 June 2004)

Town partnerships
Höhr-Grenzhausen maintains partnerships with these towns:
 Laigueglia, Riviera, Italy (since 1972)
 Semur-en-Auxois, Burgundy, France (since 1987)

Culture and sightseeing

Museums
In the town are found the Westerwald Ceramics Museum (Keramikmuseum Westerwald) and a museum of the town's history.

Buildings
 Evangelical church
 Grenzau Castle
 Limes Germanicus, a UNESCO World Heritage site, in particular the Ferbach fort

Sport
Höhr-Grenzhausen's outlying centre of Grenzau is home to the TTC Zugbrücke Grenzau, a table tennis club involved in Bundesliga play. Likewise, the Rhineland-Palatinate table tennis Olympic base is found here.

Economy and infrastructure

Economy
RASTAL GmbH & Co. KG, which is a business established in Höhr-Grenzhausen, is one of Europe's biggest manufacturers of decorated drinking vessels, especially beer glasses.

Since the 1500s, the area has been one of the most productive salt-glazed pottery centers in Europe. In the mid 16th century, potters from Raeren in Belgium migrated into the Westerwald, bringing with them some of their moulds. This type of pottery was taken to the New World and was found in the early Chesapeake settlements.

Gray Westerwald pottery is easily recognized with its curling blue flourishes, often in simple floral and leaf patterns. It is still molded by hand and fired in wood-burning kilns throughout the area. The town-wall is decorated all along its full length with huge ceramic pots made by various potters of the area. The International Ceramics Market & Museum Festival is held the first weekend in June, featuring around 150 exhibitors from all over Europe, including Spain, France, Belgium, The Netherlands, Poland and Hungary.

Notable people
 Karlheinz Zöller (1928–2005), musician

See also
German Ceramics Society
Waechtersbach ceramics
Darmstadt Artists' Colony

References

Further reading
 

Towns in Rhineland-Palatinate
Westerwaldkreis
German pottery